Neschastny Sluchai (literally "Unfortunate Event") is a Russian rock band that was formed by Valdis Pelsh and Alexey Kortnev in 1983, while both men were students at Moscow State University. 

Despite being popular in Russia, the band is virtually unknown outside. The band leader, Alexei Kortnev, has repeatedly cited as major influences such bands as Queen, King Crimson, and Genesis. The band's lyrics are at the same time grotesque and sentimental while their music features complicated structures and melodic turns rooted in the prog rock of the '70s.

Members 

 Alexey Kortnev (vocals, guitar, songwriting)
 Pavel Mordyukov (saxophone, vocals)
 Sergey Chekryzhov (keyboards, vocals)
 Dmitry Chuvelyov (guitar, vocals)
 Roman Mamaev (bass)
 Pavel Timofeev (drums, percussion)

Discography 

 1994 —  Trody pludov (Троды плудов)
 1995 —  Mein Lieber Tanz
 1996 —  Mezhsezon'e (Межсезонье)
 1997 —  Jeto ljubov''' (Это любовь)
2000 —  Chernosliv i kuraga (Чернослив и курага)
2003 —  Poslednie den'ki v raju (Последние деньки в раю)
2006 — Prostye chisla (Простые числа)
2010 — Tonnel' v konce sveta (Тоннель в конце света)
2013 — Gonjajas' za bizonom (Гоняясь за бизоном)
2014 — Kranty (Кранты)

 References 

Further reading
Graudt, Svetlana. (June 14, 2002). "Crooner Goes From Classical to Queen." The Moscow Times''. p. III.

External links
 Official website

Musical groups from Moscow
Russian rock music groups
Russian indie rock groups
Russian pop musicians
Soviet rock music groups
Russian activists against the 2022 Russian invasion of Ukraine
Musical groups established in 1983
Winners of the Golden Gramophone Award